Chegunta is a census town in Medak district of Telangana, has population of 10,747 of which 5,872 are males while 4,875 are females as per report released by Census India 2011. 
Population of Children with age of 0-6 is 655 which is 11.40% of total population of Chegunta (CT). In Chegunta Census Town, Female Sex Ratio is of 1001 against state average of 993. Moreover, Child Sex Ratio in Chegunta is around 882 compared to Andhra Pradesh state average of 939. Literacy rate of Chegunta city is 75.00% higher than state average of 67.02%. In Chegunta, Male literacy is around 86.13% while female literacy rate is 64.06%. 
Chegunta Census Town has total administration over 1,244 houses to which it supplies basic amenities like water and sewerage. It is also authorized to build roads within Census Town limits and impose taxes on properties coming under its jurisdiction.

Ethnic groups, language and religion

Transport 
Chegunta is well connected with AH-43 freeway to Telangana capital city Hyderabad and Major cities like Nizambad, Kamareddy, Medak. It also has railway station with Wadiaram (WDR) name, which has multiple trains.

References 

Census towns in Medak district